Helge or Helgi is a Scandinavian, German, and Dutch mostly male name.

The name is derived from Proto-Norse Hailaga with its original meaning being dedicated to the gods. For its Slavic version, see Oleg. Its feminine equivalent is Olga.

Notable people with this name
Halga, legendary Danish king mentioned in Beowulf and in medieval Scandinavian sources
Helgi Hjörvarðsson, Scandinavian hero from Helgakviða Hjörvarðssonar, in the Poetic Edda
Helgi Hundingsbane, Scandinavian hero who figures in the Völsunga saga and who has two poems in the Poetic Edda 
Helgi Haddingjaskati, Swedish hero from Hrómundar saga Gripssonar
Helge (Danish king), 9th-century king
Helge Akre (1903–1986), Norwegian diplomat
Helge Bostrom (1894–1977), Canadian ice hockey player
Helge Dohrmann (1939–1989), Danish politician
Helge Jung (1886–1978), Swedish general
Helgi the Sharp (disambiguation), several people
Helgi Tómasson (disambiguation), several people
Helge Rosvaenge (1897–1972), Danish-German operatic tenor
Helgi Sallo (born 1941), Estonian singer and actress
Helge Schneider (born 1955), German comedian, musician, actor and director
Helge Skoog (born 1938), Swedish actor
Helge Söderbom (1881–1975), Swedish Army lieutenant general
Helge von Koch (1870–1924), Swedish mathematician
Helge Uuetoa (1936–2008), Estonian painter, stage and film set designer

Fictional characters 
Helge Doppler, a character in Netflix's 2017 series Dark

See also
 Helge or Helgas, an ancient city and former bishopric, now a Latin Catholic titular see as Germanicopolis (Bithynia)
 Helga

Scandinavian masculine given names
Norwegian masculine given names
Swedish masculine given names
Danish masculine given names
Finnish masculine given names
Icelandic masculine given names
German masculine given names
Dutch masculine given names
Estonian feminine given names